Ratu Savenaca Nakalevu (born 7  March 1994) is a Fijian footballer who plays as a midfielder for Ba in the National Football League.

Club career
Nakalevu came through the youth ranks of Rewa and made his debut for the club in 2012. In 2018 he moved to Ba to play in the 2018 OFC Champions League.

International career
Nakalevu was part of the Fiji national under-23 team for the 2016 Summer Olympics. He played in all three of Fiji's group matches against South Korea, Mexico and Germany.

On 26 June 2016, he made his senior debut for the national team in their friendly match against Malaysia.

References

External links

1994 births
Living people
Fiji international footballers
Rewa F.C. players
Footballers at the 2016 Summer Olympics
Olympic footballers of Fiji
Fijian footballers
People from Tailevu Province
Association football midfielders